Heinrich Georg (Heinz) Kühnle (16 January 1915 – 12 October 2001) was a German Vizeadmiral and Inspector of the Navy from 1971 until 1975.

References

External links 

1915 births
2001 deaths
Bundesmarine admirals
Vice admirals of the German Navy
Chiefs of Navy (Germany)